The Tanzania Liquefied Natural Gas Project (TLNGP), also Likong’o-Mchinga Liquefied Natural Gas Project (LMLNGP), is a planned liquefied natural gas processing plant in Tanzania.

Location

Overview
Tanzania has proven natural gas reserves of 57 trillion cubic feet, with at least 49.5 trillion cubic feet of those reserves far offshore in the Indian Ocean. The government of Tanzania through the Tanzania Petroleum Development Corporation, in partnership with the BG Group (a division of Royal Dutch Shell), Equinor, Exxon Mobil, and Ophir Energy, plans to build an onshore liquefied natural gas export terminal at this location in Lindi.

History
The first offshore discovery of natural gas in Tanzania was made in 2010. Since then, other finds have been made by several petroleum prospecting companies, which decided in 2014 to build a liquefaction facility in Lindi, targeting primarily the Asian market. In August 2016, Tanzanian President John Magufuli publicly urged government bureaucrats to fast track the project so that construction could start. The government of Tanzania announced in May 2016 its plan to build a gas pipeline to neighboring Uganda.

Stakeholders
Talks between the government of Tanzania and the six oil companies involved in the project began in earnest in September 2016. 

As of 2022, the oil companies currently involved include:
 Equinor ASA (formerly Statoil ASA)
 ExxonMobil
 Ophir Energy Plc
 Pavilion Energy Private Limited
 Royal Dutch Shell

Also participating in the talks are the following parastatal agencies of the Tanzanian government.
 Tanzania Petroleum Development Corporation
 Petroleum Upstream Regulatory Authority
 Tanzania Electric Supply Company

Negotiations
In May 2018, The East African reported that the government of Tanzania was searching for a transaction adviser, to guide the Tanzania Petroleum Development Company through negotiations for a Host Government Agreement with the gas project developers. The two year contract for the selected adviser involves the development of a technical, legal and commercial framework for the LNG project. The adviser is also responsible for supporting and building capacity of the government team, as well as crafting the appropriate strategy in the negotiations towards the "host government agreement". In June 2018, the Tanzanian English-language newspaper, The Citizen, reported that the projected start date was now in 2022. In 2022, the government nailed an agreement with the companies for the construction of the LNG. A team of experts is in negotiations with some investors as the project will be executed in Lindi region.  The project is all set to begin soon.

Construction
In May 2019, the EastAfrican newspaper reported that construction was planned to start in 2022 and conclude in 2028, as announced by the Tanzanian Minister of Energy, Medard Kalemani. In June 2022, the government of Tanzania signed agreements with Equinor of Norway and British Royal Dutch Shell, reviving discussions and negotiations about moving the project forward. Final investment decision (FID) of this project, whose development cost is projected at US$30 billion, is now expected in 2025.

See also
 Mtwara–Dar es Salaam Natural Gas Pipeline

References

External links
 "Negotiating Tanzania’s Gas Future: What Matters for Investment and Government Revenues?"
 Website of Tanzania Petroleum Development Corporation

Energy infrastructure in Tanzania
Lindi
Proposed energy infrastructure in Africa
Natural gas in Tanzania
Liquefied natural gas plants